Luke List (born January 14, 1985) is an American professional golfer who plays on the PGA Tour.

Amateur career
List was born in Seattle, Washington. He was the runner-up at the 2004 U.S. Amateur to Ryan Moore, finishing 2 down. With his runner-up finish he was extended an invitation to play in the 2005 Masters, in which he finished T33 and recorded an ace during the Par 3 Contest held on Wednesday. He won the Jones Cup Invitational in 2005. He went to high school at Baylor School in Chattanooga, Tennessee. He graduated from Vanderbilt University in 2007 and turned professional.

Professional career
List joined the Nationwide Tour in 2010. He recorded four top-10 finishes during his first two years on Tour. He finished 38th on the money list in 2011 and led the tour in eagles. List won his first professional event on April 29, 2012 at the South Georgia Classic on the Nationwide Tour. The following week, List had a chance to win the Stadion Classic at UGA when he held a one shot lead over Hudson Swafford heading to the final hole of the tournament. But he bogeyed the hole while Swafford birdied it, and List finished in a tie for second.

In 2012 he finished 4th on the Nationwide money list, and was promoted to the PGA Tour. In 2013, he finished 163rd in the FedEx Cup and lost his status. He also finished 1st in driving distance, with an average of 306.3 yards per drive for the season.

In 2014, he finished 119th on the Web.com Tour. However, he still retained status from his 2012 win, and finished 64th in 2015, earning a place in the Web.com Tour Finals. There he finished 22nd (excluding the regular season top 25) to narrowly earn a place on the PGA Tour for 2015–16.

In March 2018, List lost in a sudden-death playoff at the Honda Classic to Justin Thomas. He lost to birdie on the first extra hole, after missing the green in two to the right. This was, however, List's best result to date on the PGA Tour.

List finished T4 in the 2018 Safeway Open to start the 2018–2019 season strongly.

In January 2022, List won the Farmers Insurance Open. List came from behind with a final round six-under par 66. He then had to wait almost two hours for the leaders to finish. He tied Will Zalatoris and the two went to a playoff as the sun was setting. In the playoff, List hit his third shot on the par-5 18th hole to a foot and won the tournament with a birdie. It was List's first PGA Tour victory after 206 PGA Tour starts.

Personal life
List is married to Chloe Kirby List. They have two children and reside in Augusta, Georgia.

Amateur wins
2005 Jones Cup Invitational

Professional wins (3)

PGA Tour wins (1)

PGA Tour playoff record (1–1)

Korn Ferry Tour wins (2)

Results in major championships
Results not in chronological order in 2020.

CUT = missed the half-way cut
"T" = tied
NT = No tournament due to COVID-19 pandemic

Summary

Most consecutive cuts made – 1 (five times)
Longest streak of top-10s – 1 (2019 PGA)

Results in The Players Championship

CUT = missed the halfway cut
"T" indicates a tie for a place
WD = withdrew
C = Canceled after the first round due to the COVID-19 pandemic

Results in World Golf Championships

1Cancelled due to COVID-19 pandemic

"T" = Tied
NT = No tournament
Note that the Championship and Invitational were discontinued from 2022.

U.S. national team appearances
Amateur
Palmer Cup: 2006, 2007 (winners)

See also
2012 Web.com Tour graduates
2015 Web.com Tour Finals graduates

References

External links

Profile on Vanderbilt's official athletic site

American male golfers
Vanderbilt Commodores men's golfers
PGA Tour golfers
Korn Ferry Tour graduates
Golfers from Seattle
Golfers from Tennessee
People from Catoosa County, Georgia
Sportspeople from Nashville, Tennessee
People from Jupiter, Florida
1985 births
Living people